Nevernes Church is a parish church of the Church of Norway in Rana Municipality in Nordland county, Norway. It is located in the village of Nevernes. It is the church for the Nevernes parish which is part of the Indre Helgeland prosti (deanery) in the Diocese of Sør-Hålogaland. The white, wooden church was built in a long church style in 1893 using plans drawn up by the architect Andreas Grenstad. The church seats about 250 people.

Media gallery

See also
List of churches in Sør-Hålogaland

References

Rana, Norway
Churches in Nordland
Wooden churches in Norway
19th-century Church of Norway church buildings
Churches completed in 1893
1893 establishments in Norway
Long churches in Norway